Nepenthes diatas (from Indonesian diatas "above, on top") is a tropical pitcher plant endemic to Sumatra, where it grows at an altitude of  above sea level.

Nepenthes diatas was formally described in 1997 by Matthew Jebb and Martin Cheek in their monograph "A skeletal revision of Nepenthes (Nepenthaceae)", published in the botanical journal Blumea. However, the name N. diatas had already been in use since at least 1994.

No forms or varieties of N. diatas have been described.

Taxonomy

In 2001, Charles Clarke performed a cladistic analysis of the Nepenthes species of Sumatra and Peninsular Malaysia using 70 morphological characteristics of each taxon. The following is part of the resultant cladogram, showing "Clade 3", which comprises N. diatas and three other related species.

Natural hybrids

The following natural hybrids involving N. diatas have been recorded.

N. diatas × N. mikei

References

Further reading

 Bauer, U., C.J. Clemente, T. Renner & W. Federle 2012. Form follows function: morphological diversification and alternative trapping strategies in carnivorous Nepenthes pitcher plants. Journal of Evolutionary Biology 25(1): 90–102. 
 Harwood, P. 1998. Four Nepenthes "new to science". The Carnivorous Plant Society Journal 21: 64–65.
 Harwood, P., H. Rischer & A. Wistuba 1998. The carnivorous flora of Gunung Bandahara. Carnivorous Plant Newsletter 27(2): 59–61.
 Hernawati & P. Akhriadi 2006. A Field Guide to the Nepenthes of Sumatra. PILI-NGO Movement, Bogor.
  Mansur, M. 2001. Koleksi Nepenthes di Herbarium Bogoriense: prospeknya sebagai tanaman hias. In: Prosiding Seminar Hari Cinta Puspa dan Satwa Nasional. Lembaga Ilmu Pengetahuan Indonesia, Bogor. pp. 244–253. 
 Meimberg, H., A. Wistuba, P. Dittrich & G. Heubl 2001. Molecular phylogeny of Nepenthaceae based on cladistic analysis of plastid trnK intron sequence data. Plant Biology 3(2): 164–175. 
  Meimberg, H. 2002. Molekular-systematische Untersuchungen an den Familien Nepenthaceae und Ancistrocladaceae sowie verwandter Taxa aus der Unterklasse Caryophyllidae s. l.. Ph.D. thesis, Ludwig Maximilian University of Munich, Munich. 
 Meimberg, H. & G. Heubl 2006. Introduction of a nuclear marker for phylogenetic analysis of Nepenthaceae. Plant Biology 8(6): 831–840. 
 Meimberg, H., S. Thalhammer, A. Brachmann & G. Heubl 2006. Comparative analysis of a translocated copy of the trnK intron in carnivorous family Nepenthaceae. Molecular Phylogenetics and Evolution 39(2): 478–490.

External links
Photographs of N. diatas at the Carnivorous Plant Photofinder

Carnivorous plants of Asia
diatas
Endemic flora of Sumatra
Conservation dependent plants
Plants described in 1997
Taxa named by Matthew Jebb
Taxa named by Martin Cheek